{{Infobox beauty pageant|photo=|best national costume=Sofiya Iya|withdraws=|returns=|next=2016|before=2014|photogenic=Satsuki|congeniality=|broadcaster=Channel 3 (Thailand)|caption=|venue=Pattaya, Thailand|placements=10|entrants=26|acts=Isabella SantiagoMiss International Queen 2014|presenters=Puwanart KupalinSaraichatt Jirapaet|date=10 November 2015|winner=Trixie Maristella|debuts=}}Miss International Queen 2015''', the 11th Miss International Queen pageant, was held on November 10, 2015, at Pattaya City in Thailand. Isabella Santiago of Venezuela crowned her successor, Trixie Maristela of the Philippines at the end of the event.

Results

Special Awards

Best in Talent

Contestants 
26 contestants competed for the title.

References

External links 
 

2015 beauty pageants
2015
Beauty pageants in Thailand